The Dongping Lake is a freshwater lake in Shandong Province of China. It is situated in Dongping County in the west of Shandong Province, south of the lower reaches of Yellow River. The lake has a total area of about 148 square kilometers. The average depth is 1.59 m, the water storage capacity is about 2.35×108m3.

The Dongping Lake is the second largest fresh-water lake in Shandong Province; it is the only extant water area of the Eight Hundred Li Liangshan Lake described in the famous medieval novel, Water Margin, one of the Four Great Classical Novels of Chinese literature.

The Dongping Lake will be used as a reservoir on the Eastern Route of China's South–North Water Transfer Project.  (The Yangtze River to Yellow River route, mostly piggybacking on, or paralleling, the Grand Canal of China.)
As the water transfer system entered its testing stage in the summer of 2013, the area's fish farmers started complaining that the polluted Yangtze River water entering the Dongping Lake is killing their fish.

Notes

Lakes of China
Bodies of water of Shandong